Buletin Indonesia (Indonesian Bulletin), is one of Indonesia's flagship newscasts that is carried by a private television network. Buletin Indonesia offers material about politics, both home and abroad, economy, culture and crime.

Buletin Indonesia consists of Buletin Indonesia Pagi, Buletin Indonesia Siang, and Buletin Indonesia Malam.

History 
The program appeared on 15 January 2005 when Global TV was repositioned into youth and entertainment television. At that time two daily news programs ran, Global Pagi and Global Petang.

On 3 February 2006, Global Pagi ended due to the entry of Nickelodeon on Global TV. In same date, Global Siang was launched, followed by Kilas Global.

By August 2007, Global Petang changed its name to Berita Global. On 21 January 2008 Global Pagi returns, followed by Global Malam.

On 31 July 2009, Global Pagi ended again by Nickelodeon block.

On 29 March 2012, the entire series of Global TV news programs were replaced by the Buletin Indonesia. However, Global Malam still airs until mid-2012 with the "G" logo on its intro replaced by new Global TV logo.

After the Amazing 15 show on 11 October 2017, Kilas Global renamed to short-lived Kilas GTV. On 31 October 2017, Buletin Indonesia was replaced with Buletin iNews in the program Metamorfosa iNews, including Kilas GTV to Kilas iNews.

Segments (during Buletin Indonesia) 
 Jakarta 12 Jam
 Kriminal 12 Jam
 Dunia 12 Jam
 Miss Monda
 Sipir Cantik (Hosted by Prima Alvernia)

References 

Indonesian television news shows
Indonesian-language television shows
2012 Indonesian television series debuts
2017 Indonesian television series endings
2010s Indonesian television series